Ilana Levine (born December 5, 1963) is an American actress. She made her first on-screen appearance as Andrea Spinelli in the HBO comedy-drama series Tanner '88 (1988), appearing in 11 episodes.

Career
Raised in Teaneck, New Jersey, Levine attended Teaneck High School and Fordham University. She developed an interest in acting after seeing a script resting on a counter while she was getting her hair done in 1986 at a local Teaneck hair salon. The stylist referred her to a New York City-based acting program and suggested that she audit the course.

Levine portrayed Andrea Spinelli in 11 episodes of HBO's comedy-drama series Tanner '88. In 1998, she was featured in a television and radio voice over for energy drink Red Bull. She played the role of Lucy van Pelt in the 1999 revival of the Broadway play You're A Good Man, Charlie Brown. Levine has also appeared on Broadway in Jake's Women, The Last Night of Ballyhoo, and Wrong Mountain. She is the host of the iTunes podcast Little Known Facts with Ilana Levine.

She has also appeared on numerous television shows, including Seinfeld, NYPD Blue, Lois & Clark, and Law & Order, and in films including Kissing Jessica Stein, Ira and Abby, Friends with Kids, Five Flights Up, Gigantic, Confessions Of A Shopaholic, The Nanny Diaries, Don Peyote, Storytelling, and Failure to Launch.

Personal life 
Levine is married to actor Dominic Fumusa and they have two children named Georgia and Caleb. Her husband converted to Judaism (her faith).

Filmography

References

External links

1963 births
Living people
American film actresses
Jewish American actresses
American stage actresses
American musical theatre actresses
American television actresses
Place of birth missing (living people)
Fordham University alumni
Teaneck High School alumni
21st-century American Jews
21st-century American women